Andrei Shleifer (born February 20, 1961) is a Russian-American economist and Professor of Economics at Harvard University, where he has taught since 1991. Shleifer was awarded the biennial John Bates Clark Medal in 1999 for his seminal works in three fields: corporate finance (corporate governance, law and finance), the economics of financial markets (deviations from efficient markets), and the economics of transition.

IDEAS/RePEc has ranked him as the second top economist in the world, and he is also listed as #1 on the list of "Most-Cited Scientists in Economics & Business".  He served as project director of the Harvard Institute for International Development's Russian aid project from its inauguration in 1992 until 1997, where he and his associates made Russian investments, and settled a lawsuit from the U.S. government for such a violation of HIID's contract.

Life
He was born to a Jewish family in the Soviet Union and emigrated to Rochester, New York, as a teenager in 1976, where he attended an inner-city school and learned English from episodes of Charlie's Angels.  He then studied mathematics, obtaining his BA from Harvard University in 1982. Following this, he went to graduate school in economics, acquiring his PhD from MIT in 1986.  As a freshman at Harvard, Shleifer took Math 55 with Brad DeLong; he has said that the course made him realize he was not destined to be a mathematician, but the experience gave him a future co-author. Shleifer also met his mentor and professor, Lawrence Summers, during his undergraduate education at Harvard. The two went on to be co-authors, joint grant recipients, and faculty colleagues.

He has held a tenured position in the Department of Economics at Harvard University since 1991 and was, from 2001 through 2006, the Whipple V. N. Jones Professor of Economics. Previously, he taught at the Graduate School of Business at the University of Chicago and briefly at Princeton University.

Work
Shleifer's earliest work was in financial economics, where he has contributed to the field of behavioral finance. He has also written influential papers on political economy, the economics of transition, and economic development, collaborating with his former colleagues in Chicago, Kevin M. Murphy and Robert W. Vishny. Their paper "Industrialization and the Big Push" was credited by Paul Krugman as a major breakthrough which ended a "long slump in development theory".

With coauthors Rafael La Porta, Simeon Djankov and Florencio Lopez de Silanes, Shleifer has also made significant contributions to the study of corporate governance.

In recent years, his research has focused on the legal origins theory (also sometimes known as law and finance theory), which claims that the legal tradition a country adheres to (such as common law or various types of civil law) is an important determining factor for a country's development, most of all financial development.

The Clark medal citation described him as a "superb economist, working in the old Chicago tradition of building simple models, emphasizing basic economic mechanisms, and carefully looking at the evidence.... A recurring theme of his research is the respective role of markets, institutions, and governments."

Asset management

In 1994 Shleifer founded with fellow academics—and behavioral finance specialists—Josef Lakonishok and Robert Vishny a Chicago-based money management firm known as LSV Asset Management. As of February 2006, it managed about $50 billion in quantitative value equity portfolios, though, according to the firm's website, Shleifer has sold his ownership stake.

Scandal
During the early 1990s, Andrei Shleifer headed a Harvard project under the auspices of the Harvard Institute for International Development (HIID) that invested U.S. government funds in the development of Russia's economy. Schleifer was also a direct advisor to Anatoly Chubais, then vice-premier of Russia, who managed the Rosimushchestvo ( or Committee for the Management of State Property) portfolio and was a primary engineer of Russian privatization. Shleifer was also tasked with establishing a stock market for Russia that would be a world-class capital market. In 1996 complaints about the Harvard project led Congress to launch a General Accounting Office investigation, which stated that the Harvard Institute for International Development (HIID) was given "substantial control of the U.S. assistance program.”

In 1997, the U.S. Agency for International Development (USAID) canceled most of its funding for the Harvard project after investigations showed that top HIID officials Andrei Shleifer and Jonathan Hay had used their positions and insider information to profit from investments in the Russian securities markets. Among other things, the Institute for a Law Based Economy (ILBE) was allegedly used to assist Shleifer's wife, Nancy Zimmerman, who operated a hedge fund which speculated in Russian bonds.

In August 2005, Harvard University, Shleifer and the Department of Justice reached an agreement under which the university paid $26.5 million to settle the five-year-old lawsuit. Shleifer was also responsible for paying $2 million worth of damages, though he did not admit any wrongdoing.

Works

References

External links
 Faculty page at Harvard University
 Who's Scheifer
 Citation rankings
 Institutional Investor: How Harvard Lost Russia
 Book review in Finance and Development (An IMF publication) of "Without a Map: Political Tactics and Economic Reform in Russia" by Andrei Shleifer and Daniel Treisman

1961 births
Living people
20th-century American economists
21st-century American economists
American people of Russian-Jewish descent
Behavioral economists
Economics journal editors
Economists from New York (state)
Education economists
Fellows of the American Academy of Arts and Sciences
Fellows of the Econometric Society
Fellows of the European Economic Association
Harvard Institute for International Development
Harvard University alumni
Harvard University faculty
Law and economics scholars
Macroeconomists
MIT School of Humanities, Arts, and Social Sciences alumni
Scientists from Rochester, New York
Soviet emigrants to the United States
Soviet Jews